The Ionian League (Íōnes; , koinón Iōnōn;  or , koinē sýnodos Iōnōn; Latin: commune consilium), also called the Panionic League, was a confederation formed at the end of the Meliac War in the mid-7th century BC comprising twelve Ionian Greek city-states (a dodecapolis, of which there were many others). The earliest union of city-states in the area was the Ionian League.

Overview

The twelve ancient city-states were listed by Herodotus as:
Miletus, Myus, and Priene — all located in Caria (a region in Asia Minor) and speaking the same dialect;
Ephesus, Colophon, Lebedus, Teos, Clazomenae and Phocaea — all located in Lydia and/or the region known today as Ionia (both also in Asia Minor, Lydia extending inland much farther relative to Ionia), speaking another dialect;
Chios (island) and Erythrae (Asia Minor) — with a common dialect; and
Samos (island) — with its own dialect.
After 650 BC, Smyrna, an originally Aeolic city bordering the Ionians, was invited to diminish Aeolis and increase Ionia by joining the league, which it did.

One of the earliest known historical sources, the Histories of Herodotus, and early inscriptions refer to the legally constituted body customarily translated by "league" as "the Ionians" in the special sense of the cities incorporated by it. One therefore reads of the cities, council or decisions "of the Ionians." Writers and documents of the Hellenistic Period explicitly use the term koinon ("common thing") or synodos ("synod") of the Ionians, and by anachronism apply it to the early league when they mention it.

The league was dissolved a few times and reconstituted a few times and in between its actual power varied. Under the Roman Empire it was allowed to issue its own coinage under the name koinon Iōnōn on one side with the face of the emperor on the other.

Foundation
The Meliac War was a final settlement between the ancient state of Caria and the Ionians who had been settlers on its land at the mouth of the Maeander for some centuries. Their last stronghold was the fortified settlement of Melia at the smaller peak of Dilek Daglari on the north slopes of Mycale, where the seat of their worship of Poseidon Heliconius was located. The fort was constructed in the early 7th century BC.

Carians and Ionians had been intermarrying for generations but a Carian state persisted until a coalition of Ionian cities defeated it and divided its lands among them. In view of the rising Persian threat, they decided to continue the coalition as the Ionian League, building a new religious and political center at Melia.

Delegates (theoroi) of the league gathered to celebrate the Panionia, a religious festival and games (panegyris) dedicated to Poseidon Heliconius at the sanctuary of Poseidon called the Panionium. The Ionians (who had amalgamated with the Carians) had decided to continue the worship of Poseidon. Eventually, a new temple to the god was erected about 540 BC. (Its ruins and the location of Melia were part of the Lohmann et al. discoveries of 2004; prior to then, other theories of the location had been prevalent.)

See also
 Amphictyonic League
 Delian League
 Ionia (satrapy)
 Ionian Revolt

Notes

References

 Herodotus; Histories, A. D. Godley (translator), Cambridge: Harvard University Press, 1920; . Online version at the Perseus Digital Library.

 
Society of ancient Greece
9th century BC
Ancient Smyrna
9th-century BC establishments in Greece
Ancient history of Turkey
Greek city-state federations
Former confederations